Jordan Taylor (born May 10, 1991) is an American professional racing driver. He currently competes in the WeatherTech SportsCar Championship for Corvette Racing, and part time in the NASCAR Cup Series, driving the No. 9 for Hendrick Motorsports. He won the 2017 24 Hours of Daytona (along with Jeff Gordon, Max Angelelli and brother Ricky Taylor) and the 2017 championship in the Prototype class of the WeatherTech SportsCar Championship.

Jordan also won the 2013 Rolex Sports Car Series Daytona Prototypes class and was 2014 United SportsCar Championship Prototypes class runner-up. Also Jordan won the 2015 24 Hours of Le Mans GTE-Pro class in a Chevrolet Corvette C7.R.

Jordan is the youngest son of sports car veteran Wayne Taylor. He raced a Cadillac Prototype for his father's team, where he partnered with his older brother, Ricky, from 2014 to 2017. In 2018, he partnered with Renger van der Zande, as Ricky moved to Acura Team Penske.

Racing career

Born in Orlando, Taylor began his career in professional sports car racing in 2008, competing in the 24 Hours of Daytona and finishing 15th. In 2009 he ran 8 races for Beyer Racing at the Rolex Sports Car Series in the Daytona Prototypes class. His first full season came in 2010, driving a Mazda RX-8 for Racers Edge Motorsports, claiming two GT class podiums. In 2011 he drove a Chevrolet Camaro for Autohaus Motorsports with Bill Lester, where he got one swnu and three second place finishes, ending as the GT class runner-up. In late 2011 at a private test at Sebring Jordan Taylor impressed Corvette Racing enough that they recruited Jordan to fulfill the third driver role for the team in the 2012 season competing at Sebring, Petit Le Mans and also the 24 Hours of Le Mans where he finished in 5th place in the LM GTE PRO #73 Corvette C6.R. Also in 2012, he claimed his second Rlox GT win for Autohaus Motorsports.

In 2013 he joined Wayne Taylor Racing, a team owned by his father, sports car veteran Wayne Taylor, co-driving with Max Angelelli. He and Angelelli teamed to win the 2013 Rolex Sports Car Series' Daytona Prototype championship, winning five races including the last three of the season consecutively.

In 2014, the Grand-Am Rolex Series merged with the American Le Mans Series to form the new United SportsCar Championship. With his brother Ricky Taylor as teammate, he was runner-up with two wins and six podiums. In 2015 he earned two wins and three second place finishes. The driver collected three wins and seven podiums in 2016, and was third in points.

Taylor also competed at the 24 Hours of Le Mans in 2013 through 2017 in the GTE-Pro class for Corvette Racing, where he won the GT Pro class in 2015, and finished second in 2014 and third in 2017.

For the 2017 IMSA season, Taylor drove a Cadillac DPi-V.R. in the new Daytona Prototype International class. He won the 24 Hours of Daytona, the 12 Hours of Sebring and the next three races. Later he scored two additional podiums en route to the championship.

In 2018, Renger van der Zande became his new co-driver at Wayne Taylor Racing. He scored a single win at Petit Le Mans and three additional podiums, including a second place finish at the 12 Hours of Sebring, and was third in the overall standings.

Taylor won the 2019 24 Hours of Daytona, and finished second at the 12 Hours of Sebring and Petit Le Mans. However he had poor results at the sprint races, and finished fourth in points.

For the 2020 IMSA season, Taylor became a Corvette Racing full-time factory driver. He claimed five wins and three runner-up finishes to claim his third championship.

In 2021 he got a class win at the 24 Hours of Daytona.

Taylor is expected to replace the recovering Chase Elliott for the upcoming Texas Grand Prix NASCAR Cup Series race, substituting while Elliott recovered from a leg injury he suffered in a snowboarding accident in Colorado.

Media appearances
Taylor is well known for his quirky personality and his social media presence. He has an online alter ego known as Rodney Sandstorm, a parody of 1990s racers and Jeff Gordon, whose antics have drawn positive attention toward both Taylor and IMSA.

In particular, during the 2018 Talladega broadcast, Taylor received significant media attention when he, as Rodney Sandstorm, crashed a live NASCAR on Fox broadcast, causing announcer Darrell Waltrip to call for security (not knowing what was going on).

Motorsports career results

24 Hours of Le Mans results

IMSA SportsCar Championship results
(key)(Races in bold indicate pole position, Results are overall/class)

† Non-points event.

NASCAR
(key) (Bold – Pole position awarded by qualifying time. Italics – Pole position earned by points standings or practice time. * – Most laps led.)

Cup Series

References

External links

Living people
1991 births
Sportspeople from Orlando, Florida
Racing drivers from Florida
24 Hours of Le Mans drivers
24 Hours of Daytona drivers
Rolex Sports Car Series drivers
American Le Mans Series drivers
WeatherTech SportsCar Championship drivers
12 Hours of Sebring drivers
American people of South African descent
Corvette Racing drivers
Wayne Taylor Racing drivers